This is a list of heronries in the United Kingdom.

 Allt y Gaer SSSI, Carmarthenshire, Wales
 Brownsea Island, Dorset, England
 Cleeve Heronry, Somerset, England
 Gailey Reservoirs, South Staffordshire, England
 Hilgay Heronry, Norfolk, England
 Waltham Abbey SSSI, Essex, England
 Ynys-hir RSPB reserve, Ceredigion, Wales

References